Fludiazepam, marketed under the brand name Erispan (エリスパン) is a potent benzodiazepine and 2ʹ-fluoro derivative of diazepam, originally developed by Hoffman-La Roche in the 1960s. It is marketed in Japan and Taiwan.  It exerts its pharmacological properties via enhancement of GABAergic inhibition. Fludiazepam has 4 times more binding affinity for benzodiazepine receptors than diazepam. It possesses anxiolytic, anticonvulsant, sedative, hypnotic and skeletal muscle relaxant properties. Fludiazepam has been used recreationally.

See also 
 Diazepam
 Diclazepam (the 2ʹ-chloro analog)
 Difludiazepam (the 2',6'-difluoro derivative)
 Flunitrazepam (the 7-nitro analog)
 Flualprazolam (the triazolo derivative)
 Ro20-8552

References

External links 
 
  Official Dainippon Sumitomo Pharma Website

Benzodiazepines
Sedatives
Hypnotics
Anticonvulsants
Anxiolytics
Lactams
Chloroarenes
Fluoroarenes
GABAA receptor positive allosteric modulators